Cecilia de la Fuente de Lleras (7 October 1916 – 2 March 2004; Cecilia de la Fuente Cortés) ODB She was the first lady of Colombia between 1966 and 1970, for having been married to the president of the time, Carlos Lleras Restrepo.
She was co-founder of the Colombian Family Welfare Institute (ICBF), through the Cecilia Law, and supported social initiatives in favour of less favoured children in her country.

She is the maternal grandmother of politician and former Vice President of Colombia Germán Vargas Lleras, and mother of politician Carlos Lleras de la Fuente.

First Lady of Colombia 

Her husband was elected to the third presidential term of the National Front two-party system.

Carlos's second cousin, Alberto Lleras, had created the system with conservative leader Laureano Gómez in 1956, to defeat the military dictatorship supported by conservative Ospinists and end bipartisan violence, which led to incidents such as the burning of his house in 1952.

In 1967 she promoted with the help of politicians Darío Echandía; Juan Jacobo Muñoz, minister of health of her husband; and Yolanda Pulecio, director of the Department of Social Assistance; Law 75 of 1968, called the Cecilia Law. The initiative that was approved a year later established guidelines in Colombia for responsible parenthood, and laid the foundations for the birth of the Colombian Institute of Family Welfare.

References

1916 births
2004 deaths
People from Barcelona
Lleras family
First ladies of Colombia